Spratt or Sprat is a surname of British origin, first recorded in the Domesday book of 1086 as Sprot in Essex and Sprott in Dorset. It may derive from 'sprot' (twig or small branch) or the similar 'sprit' (a small pole). An alternative derivation is from 'espirit' (an elf). Originally it was a personal name and may have been used as a nickname for a slender person.

The name may refer to:
Amanda Spratt (born 1987), Australian cyclist
Dean Spratt (1952–2007), American traffic reporter
Frederick Spratt (1927–2008), American artist
George A. Spratt (1870–1934), American inventor
George W. Spratt (1844–1934), American politician
Harry Spratt (1888–1969), Major League Baseball player
Isaac Spratt (1799–1876), British businessman
James Spratt (Royal Navy officer) (1771–1853), officer in the Royal Navy
James Spratt (Canadian politician) (1877–1960), Newfoundland builder and politician
Jimmy Spratt (1951–2021), Northern Irish politician
John Spratt (born 1942), American politician
Jonathan Spratt (born 1986), British rugby player
Norman Spratt (1885–1944), British pilot awarded the Order of the British Empire in 1925
Pete Spratt (born 1971), American mixed martial artist 
Philip Spratt (1902–1971), British writer 
Stephen Spratt (born 1960), Irish cyclist
Thomas Sprat (1635–1713), British bishop
Thomas Abel Brimage Spratt (1811–1888), British admiral
Tommy Spratt (born 1941), British football player
Vicky Spratt (fl. 2013–2018), British journalist, documentary maker, and housing rights campaigner
Walter Spratt (1889–1945), English professional footballer

See also
George Spratt (disambiguation)
James Spratt (disambiguation)
Spratt (disambiguation)

References

English-language surnames
Surnames of British Isles origin